The dusky sole, Lepidopsetta mochigarei, is a flatfish of the family Pleuronectidae. It is a demersal fish that lives on bottoms in the temperate waters of the northwest Pacific, from the Korean peninsula to the southern Sea of Okhotsk.

References

dusky sole
Fish of Japan
Fish of Korea
Commercial fish
dusky sole